Enrique Patricio Cáceres Villafañe (born 20 March 1974) is an international football referee from Paraguay. He has been a FIFA listed referee since 2010 and has taken charge of a number of major matches in Copa Libertadores and Copa América. Cáceres has also refereed matches in FIFA Club World Cup and FIFA U-20 World Cup at the international level. During the international matches, he is assisted by countrymen Eduardo Cardozo and Juan Zorrilla. Cáceres also regularly referees matches in the  Paraguayan Primera División.

FIFA World Cup

References

External links
 
 Bio

1974 births
Living people
Paraguayan football referees
Copa América referees
2018 FIFA World Cup referees